Plamen Ivanov Iliev (born 30 November 1991) is a Bulgarian professional footballer who plays as a goalkeeper for Romanian Liga I club Universitatea Cluj.

Iliev spent his early years with his hometown club Balkan Botevgrad, before joining Vidima-Rakovski's youth academy in 2006. He made his professional debut in 2009 at the age of 17 and quickly became a regular starter. In December 2010, Iliev moved to Levski Sofia for an undisclosed fee. Four and a half years later he signed for Romanian club Botoșani. In February 2017, he moved to Astra Giurgiu where he stayed two years before he returned to Bulgaria to join up with Ludogorets Razgrad.

A former regular for Bulgaria at Under-21 level, Iliev made his senior international debut in May 2012.

Club career

Vidima-Rakovski
In his youth years in Botevgrad, Iliev started to play football at Balkan. He joined Vidima-Rakovski when he was fourteen years old and signed his first professional contract in 2009.

At the beginning of the 2009–10 season, Iliev was added to Vidima's senior squad by manager Dimitar Todorov. He made his B Group debut in the starting line-up on 8 August 2009 in a 1–1 draw against Kom-Minyor. During the season he became first choice goalkeeper and earned 23 appearances, helping his team to win promotion to the A Group. Iliev was also the first choice keeper for the team from Sevlievo in the first half of the 2010–11 season and earned praise for his performances.

Levski Sofia

On 17 December 2010, Iliev was sold to Levski Sofia. He made his debut for Levski against Lokomotiv Sofia on 6 March 2011, with Iliev succeeding in keeping a clean sheet. On 6 April 2012, Iliev was appointed as Levski's captain, but became vice-captain for the 2012–13 season, as new coach Ilian Iliev decided to give the captain's armband to Stanislav Angelov.

On 14 September 2012, Iliev signed a new contract keeping him at the club until 2016.

Botoșani
On 5 June 2015, Iliev moved abroad for the first time, agreeing to a three-year deal with Romanian Liga I club FC Botoșani.

Astra Giurgiu
Following his good display at Botoșani, Iliev was signed by defending champions Astra Giurgiu on 1 February 2017.

He kept a clean sheet in his competitive debut against Politehnica Iași, with Astra conceding two goals before his substitution. On 3 April, Iliev saved two penalties in six minutes, but in an eventual 1–2 home loss to Viitorul Constanța.

After the departure of Silviu Lung Jr. to Kayserispor in the summer of 2017, Iliev became the starting goalkeeper for Astra.

Ludogorets Razgrad
On 7 January 2019, Ludogorets Razgrad confirmed that Iliev had signed a preliminary contract under the Bosman ruling and is set to join the team as a free agent in June 2019 if the negotiations between Astra and Ludogorets in January didn't end with a transfer agreement, but on 12 January the teams reached an agreement and Iliev joined the team for an undisclosed fee.

Dinamo București
After being released from Ludogorets, Iliev returned to Romania, signing a contract with local giants Dinamo București.

International career
Since 2010 Iliev has been a regular with the Bulgaria U21 side, gradually becoming first choice, taking over from Stefano Kunchev. On 11 October 2011, he was sent off in the last minute of Bulgaria's 3–2 win against Luxembourg U21 in a 2013 UEFA European Under-21 Football Championship qualifier after an altercation with Tom Laterza. Iliev was subsequently banned for 3 matches.

Iliev received his first call-up to the senior team of his country in 2011 and made his debut on 29 May 2012, in the 0–2 loss against Turkey in a friendly match after replacing Stoyan Kolev in the 76th minute. Iliev appeared as a starter for the first time in the 2–1 win over Kazakhstan in another exhibition match held on 4 June 2013, managing to keep a clean sheet, with Bulgaria conceding after his replacement.

On 31 August 2017, he saved a penalty taken by Emil Forsberg and the subsequent shot from the rebound in the 16th minute of the game in a historical 3–2 home win against Sweden. Iliev established himself as the first choice goalkeeper during Petar Hubchev's tenure as manager.

Personal life
Iliev has two children with his wife Anna - daughter Isabella and son Vladi.

Career statistics

Club

International

Honours

Club
Vidima-Rakovski
B Group: 2012–13

Levski Sofia
Bulgarian Cup runner-up: 2012–13, 2014–15

Astra Giurgiu
Cupa României runner-up: 2016–17

Ludogorets Razgrad
First Professional Football League: 2018–19, 2019–20, 2020-21
Bulgarian Supercup: 2019, 2021

Individual
 Best goalkeeper in the  Bulgarian First League: 2019

References

External links
 
 
 

1991 births
Living people
People from Botevgrad
Bulgarian footballers
Bulgaria under-21 international footballers
Bulgaria international footballers
Association football goalkeepers
First Professional Football League (Bulgaria) players
Second Professional Football League (Bulgaria) players
PFC Vidima-Rakovski Sevlievo players
PFC Levski Sofia players
PFC Ludogorets Razgrad players
Liga I players
Liga II players
FC Botoșani players
FC Astra Giurgiu players
FC Dinamo București players
FC Hermannstadt players
FC Universitatea Cluj players
Bulgarian expatriate footballers
Expatriate footballers in Romania
Bulgarian expatriate sportspeople in Romania
Sportspeople from Sofia Province